Samuel Tyrone Bowers (born December 22, 1957) is a former American football tight end who played one season with the Chicago Bears strike team of the National Football League in 1987. He first enrolled at Westchester Community College before transferring to Tennessee State University and lastly Fordham University. He attended White Plains Senior High School in White Plains, New York. Bowers was also a member of the Toronto Argonauts and New Jersey Generals. He was the Generals' all-time leader in receiving yards with 1,739.

References

External links
Just Sports Stats

Living people
1957 births
Players of American football from New York (state)
American football tight ends
African-American players of American football
Place of birth missing (living people)
African-American players of Canadian football
Tennessee State Tigers football players
Fordham Rams football players
Toronto Argonauts players
New Jersey Generals players
Chicago Bears players
People from White Plains, New York
National Football League replacement players
White Plains High School alumni
21st-century African-American people
20th-century African-American sportspeople